John Phillipps Judd (8 June 1810 – 9 April 1888) was an English cricketer with amateur status who was active in 1831. He was born in Birchanger, Essex and died in Rickling, Essex. He made his first-class debut in 1831 and appeared in one match as an unknown handedness batsman whose bowling style is unknown, playing for Cambridge University. He scored eighteen runs with a highest score of 9 and took no wickets. 
He was educated at Eton and Trinity College, Cambridge.

References

1810 births
1888 deaths
People educated at Eton College
Alumni of Trinity College, Cambridge
English cricketers
English cricketers of 1826 to 1863
Cambridge University cricketers